Mishell Baker is an American writer of fantasy. A 2009 graduate of the Clarion Workshop, her fantasy stories have been published in Daily Science Fiction, Beneath Ceaseless Skies, and Electric Velocipede.

Overview
In 2016, Baker published Borderline, the first novel in te Arcadia Project urban fantasy series with Simon & Schuster's imprint Saga Press (edited by Navah Wolfe). It was a Publishers Weekly staff pick, and Barnes & Noble chose it as one of the best science fiction and fantasy novels of 2016. Borderline is notable for having a disabled protagonist with borderline personality disorder.

The second and third books in the series, Phantom Pains and Impostor Syndrome, were released in 2017 and 2018 respectively.

Biography
Mishell Baker lives in Los Angeles, California with her partner and two children.

Novels
The Arcadia Project
 Borderline, March 2016, 
 Phantom Pains, March 2017, 
 Impostor Syndrome, March 13, 2018

Awards and nominations

Borderline
 Nominated for the 2016 Nebula Award for Best Novel.
 Included on the 2016 James Tiptree Jr. Award Honor List.
 Nominated for the 2017 World Fantasy Award—Novel.

The Arcadia Project trilogy
The trilogy taken as a whole was a finalist for the Mythopoeic Award.

References

External links

21st-century American novelists
American fantasy writers
Women science fiction and fantasy writers
Living people
21st-century American short story writers
1976 births
21st-century American women writers